The Ferrari 642 (also known as the Ferrari F1-91) was a Formula One racing car designed by Steve Nichols and Jean-Claude Migeot and was used by Scuderia Ferrari in the 1991 Formula One season.

Ferrari started the 1991 season with high hopes of winning the championship. Jean Alesi signed a contract with the Scuderia when Nigel Mansell returned to the Williams team. The 642's best result was a second-place taken by Alain Prost at the 1991 United States Grand Prix, held at the Phoenix street circuit. The 642 was replaced by the Ferrari 643 at the 1991 French Grand Prix.

Complete results
(key) (results in italics indicate fastest lap)

* 39.5 points scored using Ferrari 643

References

642